Heitland is a surname. Notable people with the surname include:

Ivy Heitland (1875–1895), English painter
Margaret Heitland (1860–1938), British journalist and activist
William Emerton Heitland (1847–1935), English classical scholar

See also
Hetland (surname)